The 2009 season was the fourth for the Lotto–Belisol Ladiesteam cycling team.

Roster

Lizzie Armitstead
Evelyn Arys
Sofie De Vuyst
Catherine Delfosse
Elise Depoorter
Rochelle Gilmore
Vera Koedooder
Lien Lanssens
Emma Mac Kie
Kim Schoonbaert
Emma Silversides
Linn Torp
Annelies van Doorslaer
Grace Verbeke

Season victories

Other achievements

Dutch national record, team pursuit

Vera Koedooder, as part of the national team, broke together with Ellen van Dijk and Amy Pieters the Dutch team pursuit record three times in 2009

Results in major races

Women's World Cup 2009

Grace Verbeke finished 9th in the individual and the team finished 7th in the teams overall standing.

UCI World Ranking

The team finished 4th in the UCI ranking for teams.

References

{{|Lotto–Belisol Ladies}}

2009 UCI Women's Teams seasons
UCI
Lotto–Soudal Ladies